5-Methylcytidine is a modified nucleoside derived from 5-methylcytosine.  It is found in ribonucleic acids of animal, plant, and bacterial origin.

References

Nucleosides
Pyrimidones
Hydroxymethyl compounds